Sidi-Hassan Chahdi (born 7 May 1989) is a French long-distance runner who competes mainly in cross country running competitions.

Born in Cluses, he has represented France four times at the IAAF World Cross Country Championships, twice as a junior and twice as a senior athlete (2011 and 2015).

He has competed seven times consecutively at the European Cross Country Championships from 2007 to 2013. During this period he was part of the gold medal-winning French teams 2007, 2008, 2009 and 2011, gathering honours at junior, under-23 and senior level in the process. Individually, he was a junior bronze medallist in 2008, under-23 runner-up in 2009, under-23 champion in 2010, and then won his first senior medal (a silver) in 2012.

In 2018, he competed in the men's marathon at the 2018 European Athletics Championships held in Berlin, Germany. He did not finish his race.

Personal life
Born in France, Chahdi is of Moroccan descent.

International competitions

References

External links

Living people
1989 births
French male long-distance runners
French sportspeople of Moroccan descent
Sportspeople from Haute-Savoie
Athletes (track and field) at the 2020 Summer Olympics
Olympic athletes of France
20th-century French people
21st-century French people